The Keystone Press Awards are a prominent series of awards presented by the Pennsylvania Newspaper Association to Pennsylvania journalists whose work displays "relevance, integrity and initiative in serving readers, and furthers First Amendment values." Presented annually during the Pennsylvania Press Conference, the awards are distributed among seven circulation size classifications.

References

External links
Keystone Press Awards homepage
Keystone Press Awards on Facebook

American journalism awards
Mass media in Pennsylvania